The 2007 Wales Rally GB (formally known as 63rd Wales Rally of Great Britain) was the 16th round of the 2007 World Rally Championship. The race was held over three days between 30 November and 2 December 2007.

Report 
Sébastien Loeb became world champion for the fourth time in a row. He had thus equaled Tommi Mäkinen's record. Third place at the season finale in Wales was enough for the Citroën driver. Loeb started the last world championship race of the season six points ahead of his rival Marcus Grönholm. Grönholm was able to make up two points with second place, and in the end Loeb had a four-point lead in the drivers' standings.

Rally won Grönholm teammate Mikko Hirvonen. He took the lead with four special stage best times on Friday. Hirvonen was 15.2 seconds clear of second-placed Gronholm to secure his fourth WRC win of his career.

Subaru driver Petter Solberg came fourth behind the leading trio. He was able to conclude such a season with moderate success in a reasonably forgiving manner. Fourth place and his teammate Chris Atkinson's seventh place secured Subaru third place in the Manufacturers' Championship ahead of the Stobart team. Days two and three were dominated by young M-Sport driver Jari-Matti Latvala, who had already been confirmed as a driver for Ford for next year. However, since he had lost almost ten minutes on the first day due to a broken windshield wiper, he was only able to finish tenth.

Results

Retirements
  Gabriel Pozzo - retired (SS6);
  Michał Sołowow - retired (SS6);
  Claudiu David - mechanical (SS7);
  Conrad Rautenbach - went off the road (SS8);
  Andreas Mikkelsen - went off the road (SS9);
  Stuart Jones - crashed (SS12);
  Leszek Kuzaj - did not start leg 3 (SS13/14);
  Hayden Paddon - did not start leg 3 (SS13/14);
  Spyros Pavlides - mechanical (SS14);
  Yevgeni Vertunov - mechanical (SS14);
  Luís Pérez Companc - went off the road (SS14/15);
  Patrik Flodin - mechanical (SS6);

Special Stages 
All dates and times are GMT (UTC).

Final championship standings

Drivers' championship

Manufacturers' championship

External links 

 Results on the official site: WRC.com
 Results on eWRC.com
 Results at Jonkka's World Rally Archive

Wales
Rally GB
Wales Rally
Wales Rally GB
Wales Rally GB